Ebean is an object–relational mapping product written in Java. It is designed to be simpler to use and understand than JPA (Java Persistence API) or JDO (Java Data Objects) products.

Simple API
Ebean has a simpler API than JPA. It achieves this through its 'Session Less' architecture. Ebean does not require a JPA EntityManager or JDO PersistenceManager and this removes the concepts of detached/attached beans and the issues associated with flushing/clearing and 'session management' of EntityManagers. This adds up to make Ebean's API much easier to learn, understand and use.

Relational features
Although Ebean has full ORM features (equivalent to JPA) it also has incorporated 'SQL/Relational' features. The idea being that many development efforts require control over the exact sql, calling stored procedures or are more simply solved with 'Relational' approaches.

Object–relational mapping
Ebean uses the same mapping as JPA with its @Entity, @Table, @OneToMany etc. annotations and xml. The mapping of Entity beans should be compatible between Ebean and JPA.

Going beyond JPA Ebean supports Java Generics and fetching "Partial" objects with its Query object.

Examples
// find customer by id
Customer customer = Ebean.find(Customer.class, 1);

//Saving the changes of the customer object
customer.save();

// more complex query with joins
List<Order> order =
   Ebean.find(Order.class)
    .fetch("customer")
    .fetch("customer.billingAddress")
    .fetch("customer.shippingAddress")
    .fetch("details")
    .fetch("details.product", "name")
    .where().eq("shipDate", today)
    .findList();

See also
 List of object–relational mapping software

References

External links

GitHub page

Object-relational mapping
Java enterprise platform